Paerau Corneal (born 1961) is a New Zealand ceramicist of Tūwharetoa and Te Āti Haunui-a-Paparangi descent.

Education
Corneal holds a certificate in craft design (1988) and a diploma in craft design Māori (1991) from Waiariki Institute of Technology.

Career
Corneal has exhibited both internationally and nationally since 1988. A consistent theme in her work is Māori female empowerment. From 2013 Corneal has collaborated with contemporary Māori dancer Louise Potiki Bryant. Their performance work entitled Kiri references a creation narrative of the first Māori human, Hineahuone, and opened for the 2014 Tempo Dance Festival in Auckland.

Throughout her career, Corneal has been involved in varying artist collectives.  She was a founding member, alongside Manos Nathan, Baye Riddell, Wi Taepa and Colleen Waata Urlich of Ngā Kaihanga Uku, a collective of Māori clay workers. 
Corneal was also involved with Kauwae, a collective of Māori women artists formed in 1997; Te Rōpū o Ngā Wāhine Kai Whakairo, a collective of Māori women carvers and Haeata Women's Collective.

Selected exhibitions
2013-5 Uku Rere, Ngā Kaihanaga Uku. Pataka Art + Museum; Whangarei Art Museum Te Manawa Toi; the Suter Art Gallery Te Aratoi o Whakatu; Waikato Museum Te Whare Taonga o Waikato; Tairawhiti Museum Te Whare Taonga o te Tairawhiti; and Te Manawa Museum of Art, Science + History.
2014 Slip Cast, The Dowse Art Museum
2009    Kauwae 09, Kauwae Group, a national collective of Mäori women artists. Tairawhiti Museum.
2005   Manawa: Pacific heartbeat. Spirit Wrestler Gallery, Vancouver. 
2003 Kiwa: Pacific connections: Maori art from Aotearoa. Spirit Wrestler Gallery, Vancouver.
2003-5 Ngā Toko Rima, Ngā Kaihanga Uku. Museum of New Zealand Te Papa Tongarewa; Tinakori Gallery, Wellington.
2002     Sisters Yakkananna/Kahui Mareikura. Tandanya National Aboriginal Cultural Institute, Adelaide. 
1998 Uku! Uku! Uku! International Festival of the Arts, Wellington
1992 Treasures of the Underworld. World Expo, Seville; Museum of New Zealand Te Papa Tongarewa.

Collections
Corneal's work is held in the collection of the Museum of New Zealand Te Papa Tongarewa.

References

1961 births
Living people
New Zealand ceramicists
New Zealand potters
New Zealand Māori artists
Women potters
New Zealand women ceramicists